The Ambassador of Malaysia to the Kingdom of Saudi Arabia is the head of Malaysia's diplomatic mission to Saudi Arabia. The position has the rank and status of an Ambassador Extraordinary and Plenipotentiary and is based in the Embassy of Malaysia, Riyadh.

List of heads of mission

Ambassadors to Saudi Arabia

See also
 Malaysia–Saudi Arabia relations

References 

 
Saudi Arabia
Malaysia